Juan Díaz (24 June 1935 – 15 June 2020) was a Chilean boxer. He competed in the men's featherweight event at the 1960 Summer Olympics.

References

External links
 

1935 births
2020 deaths
Chilean male boxers
Olympic boxers of Chile
Boxers at the 1960 Summer Olympics
Featherweight boxers
People from Tarapacá Region
20th-century Chilean people